"Give Until There's Nothing Left" is the third single from Relient K's fifth album, Five Score and Seven Years Ago. It was released to Christian radio around July 2007, was played as a Top 40 single to a station in Saginaw, MI in early August. The song being a slower one, it was released for contemporary stations, rather than rock stations. The band also made the song available as a profile song on the group's MySpace. It has reached No. 17 on the Billboard Hot Christian Songs chart. While it may have played on some mainstream stations, the song did not receive a music video like "Must Have Done Something Right" and "The Best Thing". The single was the 20th most played song on Christian Hit Radio stations in 2007 according to R&R magazine.

References

2007 singles
Relient K songs
Contemporary Christian songs
Songs written by Matt Thiessen
2007 songs
Gotee Records singles
Song recordings produced by Howard Benson
Capitol Records singles